Florence "Flores" LaDue (1883–1951) was the stage name of vaudeville performer and champion trick roper Grace Bensel.

Biography 
Born Grace Maud Bensel in Montevideo, Minnesota, her mother died while she was an infant and her father, C.D. Bensel, was a criminal lawyer and later a judge. She spent most of her young life on a Sioux reservation where her grandfather was the government agent.

Bensel left home, by some accounts running away to join a wild west show, and began performing under the name Florence LaDue. By 1905 she was appearing with Cummins’s Wild West Show and Indian Congress. While there, she met Guy Weadick, who was also an accomplished rider and roper, and they married in 1906.

Florence LaDue and Guy Weadick led a peripatetic life for the next five years. They worked with John P. Kirk’s Elite Vaudeville co. in 1908 and were appearing with Will Rogers’ Wild West show in 1910. They had a stint on Broadway in ‘Wyoming Days’ and did the Keith-Albee, Orpheum, and Pantages vaudeville circuits, as well as appearances in Glasgow, London, and Paris. LaDue often performed solo, but also with her husband, as Weadick and LaDue, and in larger groups.

By 1912, they settled in Calgary, Alberta, where LaDue helped her husband found the Calgary Stampede.

LaDue retired as undefeated World Champion Lady Fancy Roper after performing and competing for 31 years. Towards the end of her life, in the hopes of improving her failing health, they sold their home, outside Calgary and moved to Phoenix, AZ. LaDue died of heart failure in 1951.

Legacy
In 2001 she was inducted into the National Cowgirl Museum and Hall of Fame.

LaDue is profiled in a children's book called Howdy, I'm Flores LaDue by Ayesha Clough, with illustrations by Hugh Rookwood and Keegan Starlight, published in 2022 by Red Barn Books. ISBN 9781989915042.

References

1883 births
1951 deaths
Vaudeville performers
People from Montevideo, Minnesota
Sportspeople from Calgary
Trick roping
Trick riding
Women stunt performers
Cowgirl Hall of Fame inductees